The 1937–38 League of Ireland was the seventeenth season of the League of Ireland. Sligo Rovers were the defending champions.

Shamrock Rovers won their fifth title.

Overview
Dolphin resigned from the League voluntarily, while Limerick were elected in their place.

Teams

Table

Results

Top goalscorers 

Ireland
Lea
League of Ireland seasons